The 2019 TC America Series was the first season of the United States Auto Club's TC America Series. It was the third season of the series, originally part of the Touring Car categories at the 2017 Pirelli World Challenge, and second season as a standalone class.  Under the global realignment of the Blancpain GT World Challenge America by SRO Motorsports Group, the GT4 and TCR classes are now declared separate support series, and not under the same umbrella of the World Challenge as it was prior to SRO's ownership.  However, the series will continue to be part of the World Challenge. The TCR division will include a DSG Cup for vehicles equipped with a Direct-shift gearbox.

Calendar 
At the annual press conference during the 2018 24 Hours of Spa on 27 July, the Stéphane Ratel Organisation announced the first draft of the 2019 calendar.

Entry list

TCR/TCA 
{|
|
{| class="wikitable" style="font-size: 85%;"
!Team
!Car
!
!Drivers
!Class
!Rounds
|-
! colspan="6" | TCR entries
|-
|rowspan=2|  RS Werkes
|rowspan=2| Audi RS 3 LMS TCR (DSG)
| 011
|  Todd Archer 
|rowspan=2 align="center" |DSG
| 1
|-
| 11
|  Jay Salinsky
| 2
|-
|rowspan=4|  McCann Racing
| Audi RS 3 LMS TCR (DSG)
|rowspan=2| 3
|rowspan=2|  Michael McCann 
| align="center" |DSG
| 1–4
|-
| Audi RS 3 LMS TCR 
| align="center" |TCR
| 5–8
|-
| Audi RS 3 LMS TCR (DSG)
| 27
|  Christian Cole
| align="center" |DSG
| All
|-
| Audi RS 3 LMS TCR
| 83
|  Britt Casey Jr.
| align="center" |TCR| 3
|-
|  TFB
|rowspan=2| Hyundai Veloster N TCR
|rowspan=2| 12
|rowspan=2|  Mason Filippi
|rowspan=2 align="center" |TCR| 1
|-
|  Copeland Motorsports
| 4–6, 8
|-
|  LAP Motorsports
| Honda Civic Type R TCR (FK8)
| 14
|  Nelson Cheung
| align="center" |TCR| 1, 4
|-
|  eEuroparts.com ROWE Racing
|rowspan=2| Audi RS 3 LMS TCR (DSG)
|rowspan=2| 15
|rowspan=2|  Brian Putt
|rowspan=2 align="center" |DSG| 1–6
|-
|  Bsport Racing
| 7–8
|-
|  EXR Team by Premat
| Audi RS 3 LMS TCR (DSG)
| 18
|  Stephen Vajda
| align="center" |DSG| 4–6, 8
|-
|  Risi Competizione
| Alfa Romeo Giulietta TCR
| 34
|  James Walker
| align="center" |TCR| All
|-
|rowspan=2|  TWOth Autosports
|rowspan=2| Audi RS 3 LMS TCR (DSG)
| 37
|  Eddie Killeen
| rowspan=2 align="center" |DSG| 1–2, 6
|-
| 41
|  Travis Hill
| 6
|-
| rowspan=2|  Alphasonic Motorsport
| rowspan=2| Audi RS 3 LMS TCR (DSG)
| 45
|  Nelson Chan
| rowspan=2 align="center" |DSG| 1–2
|-
| 47
|  Alain Lauziere
| 1–2
|-
| rowspan=2|  FCP Euro
| rowspan=2| Volkswagen Golf GTI TCR
| 71
| Michael Hurczyn
| rowspan=2 align="center" |TCR| All
|-
| 72
| Nate Vincent
| All
|-
|  VGMC Racing
| Honda Civic Type R TCR (FK8)
| 99
|  Victor Gonzalez
| align="center" |TCR| 3–8
|-
! colspan="6" | TCA entries
|-
! Team
! Car
! 
! Drivers
!colspan=2| Rounds
|-
|rowspan=4|  X-Factor Racing
|rowspan=4| Honda Civic Si
| 02
|  Stephen Jeu
|colspan=2| All
|-
| 25
|  Cole Ciraulo
|colspan=2| All
|-
| 69
|  Chris Haldeman
|colspan=2| All
|- 
| 77
|  Taylor Hagler
|colspan=2| All
|-
|  Ives Motorsports
| Mazda Global MX-5 Cup
| 07
|  Jose DaSilva
|colspan=2| All
|-
|  Ian Lacy Racing
| Mazda Global MX-5 Cup
| 10
|  Jenny Gannett
|colspan=2| All
|-
|rowspan=3|  Copeland Motorsports
|rowspan=3| Mazda Global MX-5 Cup
| 50
|  Dinah Weisberg 
|colspan=2| All
|-
| 70
|  Bryan Ortiz
|colspan=2| 8
|-
| 74
|  Tyler Maxson
|colspan=2| All
|-
|rowspan=5|  MINI JCW Team
|rowspan=5| MINI Cooper
| 59
|  Mark Pombo
|colspan=2| All
|-
| 60
|  Nate Norenberg
|colspan=2| All
|-
|rowspan=2| 61
|  Luis Perocarpi
|colspan=2| 6
|-
|  Mat Pombo
|colspan=2| 7–8
|-
| 62
|  Tomas Mejia
|colspan=2| 6–8
|-
|rowspan=10|  TechSport Racing
|rowspan=10| Subaru BRZ tS
| 22
|  Damon Surzyshyn
|colspan=2| All
|-
|rowspan=2| 24
|  Robert Crocker
|colspan=2| 1, 3–5
|-
|  Mike Ogren
|colspan=2| 6
|-
| 29
|  Breton Williams
|colspan=2| 7
|-
|rowspan=2| 44
|  P. J. Groenke
|colspan=2| All 
|-
|  Kevin Anderson
|colspan=2| *
|-
|rowspan=2| 91
|  Nick Wittmer
|colspan=2| All
|-
|  Eric Powell
|colspan=2| *
|-
|rowspan=2| 95
|  Ben Bettenhausen
|colspan=2| 1, 3–6
|-
|  Mike Ogren
|colspan=2| *
|-
|  Bryan Herta Autosport with Curb Agajanian
| Hyundai Veloster Turbo R-Spec
| 57
|  Tyler Gonzalez
|colspan=2| 8
|-
|  #TEAMSALLY
| Honda Civic Si
| 780
|  Sally McNulty
|colspan=2| 1, 4–6
|-
|}
|valign="top"|

|}
Notes
 – Drivers with an asterisk in the "Rounds" column took part in the non-championship round at St. Petersburg.

TC

Race results
TCR/TCABold''' indicates overall winner.

TC

Championship standings
Scoring system
Championship points are awarded for the first ten position in each race. Entries are required to complete 75% of the winning car's race distance in order to be classified and earn points.

Drivers' championships

TCR/TCA

Notes
 ‡ — The St. Petersburg round was a non-championship event for TCA cars, so no points were awarded.

TC

Teams' championships
Only the highest finishing car per team scores points and all other cars entered by that team are invisible as far as scoring points concerned.

TCR/TCA

Notes
 ‡ — The St. Petersburg round was a non-championship event for TCA cars, so no points were awarded.

TC

Manufacturers' championships
Only the highest finishing car per manufacturer scores points and all other cars entered by that manufacturer are invisible as far as scoring points concerned.

TCR/TCA

Notes
‡ — The St. Petersburg round was a non-championship event for TCA cars, so no points were awarded.

TC

Notes

References

External links 

 

TC
America